The Hundred of Oladdie is a hundred in the County of Dalhousie, South Australia., South Australia. The hundred was established 1876 but has no townships. A settlement at Oladdie was abandoned.

Oladdie is south of Johnburgh , east of Eurelia  and southeast of Ivy Glen homestead.

References

Oladdie